John Augustus Atkinson (c.1775–1830) was an English artist, engraver and watercolourist.

Life
Atkinson was born in London. In 1784, he went to St. Petersburg to his uncle James Walker, engraver to the empress Catherine the Great There he studied in the picture galleries, encouraged by Catherine and her son Paul I, and was commissioned by Paul to paint large pictures of Russian history.

In 1801, Atkinson returned to England, and in 1803 published A Picturesque Representation of the Manners, Customs, and Amusements of the Russians, in 100 plates, drawn and etched by himself. He also painted in watercolours and in 1808 was elected to the Society of Painters in Water Colours. Many of his works, during the Napoleonic wars, were of naval subjects. He painted many battle scenes including a Battle of Waterloo, which was engraved by John Burnet.

His last contribution to the Royal Academy exhibition was in 1829. He died on 25 March 1830 in London. His will was dated 1830.

Selected works

Carriage on Sledges 1803 Art Gallery of Greater Victoria, British Columbia
A Russian Village 1804 Art Gallery of Greater Victoria, British Columbia
Golubtza 1804 Art Gallery of Greater Victoria, British Columbia
Village Amusements 1804 Art Gallery of Greater Victoria, British Columbia
Scene from Tom Jones Courtauld Institute of Art, London
The Slack Rope Courtauld Institute of Art, London
A  Belgian Waggon with Four Horses Tate Gallery, London
Illustrations to Ossian The Huntington Library, California
Heaving a Lead 1807 National Maritime Museum
Greenwich Pensioners 1808 National Maritime Museum
Skating, 1810 Tyne & Wear Museums, England
Ships of the Reign of King Edward IV 1812 - Fine Arts Museums of San Francisco
42nd Highlanders at Waterloo Courtauld Institute of Art, London
British Sailors Boarding a Man of War 1815 National Maritime Museum

References

Attribution:
 

Date of birth unknown
1830 deaths
18th-century English painters
English male painters
19th-century English painters
English watercolourists
English engravers
Painters from London
Year of birth uncertain
19th-century English male artists
18th-century English male artists